Malaysia National Hockey Stadium is a multi-use stadium in National Sports Complex, Bukit Jalil, Kuala Lumpur, Malaysia. It is currently used mostly for the Malaysia national field hockey team and the Malaysia women's national field hockey team. It was also used for the field hockey matches of national team and hosted matches for the 2002 Men's Hockey World Cup, 1999 Hockey Asia Cup, 2003 Hockey Asia Cup, 1982 Hockey Junior World Cup, 2000 Hockey Junior Asia Cup and 1998 Commonwealth Games. The main stadium holds up to 12,000 people and was built in 1997. There is a second pitch located adjacent to the stadium, which is used to hold smaller capacity and practice matches.

References

Field hockey venues in Malaysia
Multi-purpose stadiums in Malaysia
Sports venues in Kuala Lumpur